One of Canada's Rockabilly bands, The Nervous Fellas began in Vancouver, British Columbia around the winter of 1986. The band took its name from the lyrics of a Smiley Lewis song titled "Real Gone Lover". Their set list comprised obscure covers from the 1950s and their own original songs.

The original lineup with Butch Murphy on vocals, Ronnie Hayward on bass, Chris Colt on guitar and Al Black on drums played mostly in Vancouver and were known for their stage show and fast-paced rockabilly. That lineup changed and by 1988 the band was Butch Murphy on vocals, Mark (Weldon) Twang on guitar, Ronnie Hayward on bass and John (Hansen) Decan on drums. That lineup started to take off when they signed a management deal with one of the top West Coast music agencies 'S.L. Feldman & Associates' and started to tour Canadian nightclubs and universities.

Ronnie Hayward was later replaced by Pete Turland in the summer of 1989. Pete Turland had been in The Baskervilles along with Darrel Higham when he lived in London,England.  They were one of the most exciting bands of their day. Turland was also the bassist in England's country swing/rockabilly band Rusti Steel And The Tin Tax.

'Wild Wild baby' is a fantastic slab of rockabilly. It was first released on "The Other Side Of Rock N Roll" and then released on 'Boppin' In Canada': a 1991 compilation of Canadian rockabilly on UK's Nervous Records.

The Nervous Fellas first self-titled release "The Other Side Of Rock N Roll" was produced by Jimmy Roy from the Ray Condo band. It was recorded in Jimmy Roy's living room.

Their second studio recording 'Born To Be Wild' was released on Nervous Records in 1990.
They often played at "The Railway Club" in Vancouver, where the idea of the band was formed.
By the release of 'Born To Be Wild', the band had a following and were billed as "Canada's Rockabilly Madmen".

In the beginning, they started as an opening act for such bands as The Pogues, Tragically Hip, George Thorogood, and Junior Wells, but it was not long before they grabbed the main stage themselves.

While the band had a strong showing on the college radio charts, they were unable to break into mainstream radio play.

Personnel
Many personnel changes happened during the Nervous Fellas' short 5 year life. Chris Colt left in late 1987 to be replaced by Mark Twang.
Al Black left in the fall of 1988 to play full-time in the Last Wild Sons. 
Butch Murphy was also in the Last Wild Sons.
Al Black was replaced by John Decan on drums in 1988. Billy Rogers became the drummer in late 1990.

Billy Rogers had tasted some success with such bands as Johnny Thunders and the Ramones.
Billy Rogers died from complications due to pneumonia, at his home in Toronto, on Tuesday, August 7, 2001.

Ronnie Hayward left in 1989 and was later replaced by Pete Turland. Pete, originally from England, had been in The Baskervilles along with Darrel Higham. 
The only original member to stay from the beginning to the end, which was in 1992, was singer Butch Murphy.

 
Recent postings of the band on YouTube have piqued the interest of rockabilly fans.

The Reunion Show : Nervous Fellas (featuring the original members), Swank, The Deadcats @ Rickshaw Theatre June 20, 2009. 
 
At the reunion show, a CD release was made available for the first time, which contained lost recordings from 1987. It was recorded in Jimmy Roy's living room as well. They did a few more shows but the original lineup didn't last and performed their last show on October 23, 2009, at Malone's in Vancouver.

The band resurfaced later in the year with members Butch Murphy, Chris Colt, Phil Addington & Al Black Davidson at the Wise Hall NYE with Cousin Harley. Gary Fraser joined the band on keyboards shortly after this show. The band did occasionally shows up in Vancouver playing small sets. They recently did a set in 2017 at the Fairview in Vancouver, a benefit show STANFEST for long time door man at the Railway Club, Stan. This appears to be the Nervous Fellas' official last show.

The Nervous Fellas name was also used by a band in UK after the original band broke up but does not have any of the Canadian members.

Discography 
The Nervous Fellas - Born to be Wild - Released in 1990 http://www.nervous.co.uk/nervousfellas.html
The Nervous Fellas - Raw & Biting - Lost recording from 1987 - Released in 2009
The Nervous Fellas - Live at the Rickshaw - Released in 2010
The Nervous Fellas - The Other Side of Rock & Roll - Released in 1987 - very rare tape release

References 

 http://www.ffwdweekly.com/Issues/1999/1223/street.html
 http://www.rockabillyhall.com/RonnieHayward.html
 https://thenervousfellas.com/
https://www.facebook.com/NervousFellas
Georgia Straight November 30 – December 7, 1990, by Norah Holtby
The West Ender November 30, 1989, by Mike Usinger
The Winnipeg Sun January 20, 1989
The Province by Tom Harrison Tuesday June 28, 1988
The Vancouver Sun by Michael Groberman April 16, 1988
Nites Moves May 1989
The Calgary Herald, Nitebeat September 13, 1988
Music '91 Labatts Canada Live February 24 – March 5, 1991
Vox Magazine December 1990 by Hector Litorco
https://www.facebook.com/events/226165457787986/
https://www.facebook.com/events/10152707267816822/

External links

Official Facebook site

Musical groups established in 1986
Musical groups disestablished in 1992
Canadian rock music groups
1986 establishments in British Columbia
1992 disestablishments in British Columbia